Friedrich Hermann Hund (4 February 1896 – 31 March 1997) was a German physicist from Karlsruhe known for his work on atoms and molecules.

Scientific career
Hund worked at the Universities of  Rostock, Leipzig, Jena, Frankfurt am Main, and Göttingen.

Hund worked with such prestigious physicists as Schrödinger, Dirac, Heisenberg, Max Born, and Walter Bothe. At that time, he was Born's assistant, working with quantum interpretation of band spectra of diatomic molecules.

After his studies of mathematics, physics, and geography in Marburg and Göttingen, he worked as a private lecturer for theoretical physics in Göttingen (1925), professor in Rostock (1927), Leipzig University (1929), Jena (1946), Frankfurt/Main (1951) and from 1957 again in Göttingen. Additionally, he stayed in Copenhagen (1926) with Niels Bohr and lectured on the atom at Harvard University (1928). He published more than 250 papers and essays in total. Hund made pivotal contributions to quantum theory - especially concerning the structure of the atom and of molecular spectra.

In fact, Robert S. Mulliken, who was awarded the 1966 Nobel Prize in chemistry for molecular orbital theory, always proclaimed the great influence Hund's work had on his own and that he would have gladly shared the Nobel prize with Hund. In recognition of the importance of Hund's contributions, MO theory is often referred to as the Hund-Mulliken MO theory. Hund's rule of maximum multiplicity is another eponym and, in 1926, Hund discovered the so-called tunnel effect or quantum tunnelling.

The Hund's cases, which are particular regimes in diatomic molecular angular momentum coupling, and Hund's rules, which govern atomic electron configurations, are important in spectroscopy and quantum chemistry. In chemistry, the first rule, Hund's rule of maximum multiplicity, is especially important and is often referred to as simply Hund's Rule.

Personal life
Friedrich Hund is buried in Munich Waldfriedhof. He was a member of the International Academy of Quantum Molecular Science. His son is chess player and mathematician Gerhard Hund.

Legacy
On the occasion of his 100th birthday, the book: Friedrich Hund: Geschichte der physikalischen Begriffe [History of Physical Concepts] (Heidelberg, Berlin, Oxford), Spektrum, Akademie Verlag 1996,  was published. A review was also written by Werner Kutzelnigg.

In addition to the many honors bestowed upon him, Friedrich Hund became an honorary citizen of Jena/Saale, and a street in Jena was named after him. In June 2004, a part of a new building of the Physics Department in Göttingen was given the address Friedrich-Hund-Platz 1. The same name was chosen for the Institute for Theoretical Physics at the University of Göttingen.

Publications 
 Versuch einer Deutung der großen Durchlässigkeit einiger Edelgase für sehr langsame Elektronen, Dissertation, Universität Göttingen 1923
 Linienspektren und periodisches System der Elemente, Habil.Schrift, Universität Göttingen, Springer 1927
 Allgemeine Quantenmechanik des Atom- und Molekelbaues, in Handbuch der Physik, Band 24/1, 2nd edn., pp. 561–694 (1933)
 Materie als Feld, Berlin, Springer 1954
 Einführung in die Theoretische Physik, 5 vols. 1944-51, Meyers Kleine Handbücher, Leipzig, Bibliographisches Institut, 1945, 1950/51 (vol. 1: Mechanik, vol. 2: Theorie der Elektrizität und des Magnetismus, vol. 3: Optik, vol. 4: Theorie der Wärme, vol. 5: Atom- und Quantentheorie)
 Theoretische Physik, 3 vols., Stuttgart Teubner, zuerst 1956-57, vol. 1: Mechanik, 5th edn. 1962, vol. 2: Theorie der Elektrizität und des Lichts, Relativitätstheorie, 4th edn. 1963, vol. 3: Wärmelehre und Quantentheorie, 3rd edn. 1966
 Theorie des Aufbaues der Materie, Stuttgart, Teubner 1961
 Grundbegriffe der Physik, Mannheim, Bibliographisches Institut 1969, 2nd edn. 1979
 Geschichte der Quantentheorie, 1967, 2nd edn., Mannheim, Bibliographisches Institut 1975, 3rd edn. 1984; Eng. trans. 1974
 Quantenmechanik der Atome, in Handbuch der Physik/Encyclopedia of Physics, Band XXXVI, Berlin, Springer 1956
 Die Geschichte der Göttinger Physik, Vandenhoeck und Ruprecht 1987 (Göttinger Universitätsreden)
 Geschichte der physikalischen Begriffe, 1968, 2nd edn. (2 vols.), Mannheim, Bibliographisches Institut 1978 (vol. 1: Die Entstehung des mechanischen Naturbildes, vol. 2: Die Wege zum heutigen Naturbild), Spektrum Verlag 1996
 Göttingen, Kopenhagen, Leipzig im Rückblick, in Fritz Bopp (ed.) Werner Heisenberg und die Physik unserer Zeit, Braunschweig 1961
 See also Verzeichnis der Schriften Friedrich Hund (1896-1997) with about 300 entries

See also
Sharp series
Spin isomers of hydrogen

References

External links

 Curriculum vitae, papers, diploma, honours, medals and decorations, photography, films and cassettes of Friedrich Hund by Gerhard Hund
 

1896 births
1997 deaths
Commanders Crosses of the Order of Merit of the Federal Republic of Germany
German centenarians
Men centenarians
20th-century German physicists
Members of the International Academy of Quantum Molecular Science
People from the Grand Duchy of Baden
Scientists from Karlsruhe
Academic staff of the University of Göttingen
University of Jena alumni
Leipzig University alumni
University of Rostock alumni
Winners of the Max Planck Medal
Members of the German Academy of Sciences at Berlin
Burials at Munich Waldfriedhof
Members of the Göttingen Academy of Sciences and Humanities